Frederic William Olmstead (July 3, 1881 – October 22, 1936) was a pitcher in Major League Baseball. He played for the Chicago White Sox from 1908 to 1911.

References

External links

1881 births
1936 deaths
Major League Baseball pitchers
Chicago White Sox players
Baseball players from Grand Rapids, Michigan
Springfield Highlanders players
Springfield Midgets players
Des Moines Boosters players
Minneapolis Millers (baseball) players
Denver Grizzlies (baseball) players
Spokane Indians players
American Freemasons